The Hudson Bay Mine is an abandoned silver mine in Cobalt, Ontario, Canada. It is located north of the Trethewey Mine near Sasaginaga Creek.

References

External links

Hudson Bay Mine, Cobalt, Coleman Township, Timiskaming District, Ontario, Canada

Silver mines in Canada
Mines in Cobalt, Ontario